Goran Šprem (born 6 July 1979) is a retired Croatian handball player.

Šprem started his professional career with RK Zagreb in the late 1990s. He also spent a season with RK Medveščak Zagreb in 2001 and 2002, before returning to RK Zagreb for a second spell with the club between 2002 and 2004. He eventually left RK Zagreb for German side SG Flensburg-Handewitt in October 2004. He left Flensburg for a short spell with TuS Nettelstedt in February 2005, returning to the club in the summer of the same year and eventually spending a season with them. In the summer of 2006, he left Flensburg for a short spell with MT Melsungen, before joining his current club, HSG Nordhorn, in November 2006. He left Nordhorn in 2009.

Šprem is also a member of the Croatian national handball team, with whom he won gold medals at the 2003 World Men's Handball Championship and the 2004 Summer Olympics. He also won two silver medals with the Croatian national team at the World Men's Handball Championships in 2005 and 2009, and participated at the 2006 European Men's Handball Championship, where Croatia finished fourth.

Since his retirement he's been a pundit on RTL Televizija.

Honours
Zagreb
Dukat Premier League 
Winner (9): 1996-97, 1997–98, 1998–99, 1999-00, 2000–01, 2002–03, 2003–04, 2009–10, 2010–11
Croatian Cup 
Winner (8): 1997, 1998, 1999, 2000, 2003, 2004, 2010, 2011
EHF Champions League
Finalist (2): 1997-98, 1998-99

SG Flensburg-Handewitt
DHB-Pokal
Winner (1): 2005

HSG Nordhorn
EHF Cup
Winner (1): 2008

Individual
Franjo Bučar State Award for Sport - 2004

Orders
Order of Danica Hrvatska with face of Franjo Bučar - 2004

References

External links
European Competition 

1979 births
Living people
Sportspeople from Dubrovnik
Croatian male handball players
Olympic handball players of Croatia
Handball players at the 2004 Summer Olympics
Handball players at the 2008 Summer Olympics
Olympic gold medalists for Croatia
RK Zagreb players
Olympic medalists in handball
Medalists at the 2004 Summer Olympics
Mediterranean Games gold medalists for Croatia
Competitors at the 2001 Mediterranean Games
Mediterranean Games medalists in handball